Tedla Bairu (1914–1981) was an Eritrean  political figure. He was the last independent head of state of Eritrea in 1952. He was then the first Chief Executive of Eritrea from 1952 in federation with Ethiopia, until he resigned in 1955.

After Emperor Haile Selassie forced his resignation he was appointed as ambassador to Sweden from Ethiopia in 1967 he defected to the Eritrean Liberation Front.

References

Federation of Ethiopia and Eritrea
1914 births
1984 deaths
Eritrean politicians
Ambassadors of Ethiopia to Sweden